The following is a list of all the squads of the national teams participating in the 2017 FIFA U-17 World Cup.

Each team had to name a squad of 21 players (three of whom must be goalkeepers) by the FIFA deadline.

All players of its representative team must have been born on or after 1 January 2000.

Those marked in bold have been capped at full International level.

Group A

India 
Head coach:  Luís Norton de Matos

United States
Head coach:  John Hackworth

Colombia

Colombia named their squad on 15 September 2017.

Head coach:  Orlando Restrepo

Ghana

Ghana named their squad on 21 September 2017.

Head coach:  Paa Kwesi Fabin

Group B

Paraguay
Head coach:  Gustavo Morínigo

Mali
Head coach:  Jonas Komla

New Zealand
New Zealand named their squad on 21 September 2017.
Liam Moore was called up to as an injury replacement for Jordan Spain.

Head coach:  Danny Hay

Turkey
Turkey named their squad on 16 September 2017.

Head coach:  Mehmet Hacıoğlu

Group C

Iran
Head coach:  Abbas Chamanyan

Guinea
Head coach:  Souleymane Camara

Germany
Head coach:  Christian Wück

Costa Rica

Head coach:  Camacho Viquez

Group D

North Korea
Head coach:  Kim Yong-su

Niger
Head coach:  Ismaila Tiemoko

Brazil
Brazil named their squad on 8 September 2017.

Head coach:  Carlos Amadeu

Spain
Head coach:  Santiago Denia

Group E

Honduras
Head coach: José Valladares

Japan
Japan named their squad on 22 September 2017.

Head coach:  Yoshiro Moriyama

New Caledonia
New Caledonia named their squad on 14 September 2017.

Head coach: Dominique Wacalie

France
France named their squad on 21 September 2017.

Head coach:  Lionel Rouxel

Group F

Iraq

Head coach:  Qahtan Chathir

Mexico
Mexico named their squad on 15 September 2017.

Head coach:  Mario Arteaga

Chile

Head coach:  Hernán Caputto

England
Head coach:  Steve Cooper

*Sancho was withdrawn from the squad after the completion of the group stages by his club, Borussia Dortmund.

References

External links
 https://web.archive.org/web/20171030233616/http://tournament.fifadata.com/documents/FU17/2017/PDF/FU17_2017_SQUADLISTS.PDF

FIFA U-17 World Cup squads
squads